This is a list of the competitive matches played by the Syrian football team since its inception.

International matches

1940s

1950s

1960s

1970s

1980s

1990s

2000s

2010s

External links
 

1940
1940s in Syrian sport
1950s in Syrian sport
1960s in Syrian sport
1970s in Syrian sport
1980s in Syrian sport
1990s in Syrian sport